Lygephila yoshimotoi is a moth of the family Erebidae. It is found in Taiwan.

The length of the forewings is about 17 mm. The forewings are greyish brown with a violet tint and suffused with dark brown. The hindwings are dirty greyish brown.

References

 , 1989: Two new species of the genus Lygephila Billberg from Taiwan (Lepidoptera: Noctuidae). Tyô to Ga 40 (2): 141-148. Abstract and full article: .

Moths described in 1989
Toxocampina